John James Majendie DD (1709–1783) was a Canon of Windsor from 1774 to 1783.

Life

His father, André Majendie, was a Huguenot minister who fled to England after the Edict of Nantes.

He lived at 10 Denmark Street London from 1758 to 1771.

He was appointed:
Tutor to the Prince of Wales and the Duke of York
Instructor of Queen Charlotte in the English language
Vicar of Stoke Prior 1769–1783
Prebendary of Netheravon in Wiltshire 1752–1783
Prebendary of the 8th Canonry at Worcester 1769–1774
 to the fifth stall in St George's Chapel, Windsor Castle in 1774 and held the canonry until his death.

He was elected a Fellow of the Royal Society in 1768.

He died at Weston, near Bath in 1783. His son Henry William Majendie became Bishop of Chester and Bishop of Bangor.

Notes 

1709 births
1783 deaths
Canons of Windsor
Fellows of the Royal Society